The 1974 Villanova Wildcats football team represented the Villanova University as an independent during the 1974 NCAA Division I football season. Jim Weaver was the team's head coach for the first eight games of the season, before he was fired after the disclosure of his intentions to quit at the end of the season and take an administrative position at Clarion State College. Lou Ferry, who had been Villanova's head coach from 1970 to 1973 and remained as the team's defensive line coach in 1974, assumed the role of interim head coach for the last three games of the season. The team played their home games at Villanova Stadium in Villanova, Pennsylvania. Villanova was 3–1 and ranked seventh in the Lambert Trophy poll after four games, but lost their final seven contests and finished the season with a record of 3–8.

Schedule

References

Villanova
Villanova Wildcats football seasons
Villanova Wildcats football